The Darling Downs Golf Association consists of 21 affiliated Golf Clubs on Queensland's (Australia) Darling Downs..

References

Golf in Queensland
Darling Downs
Sports organisations of Australia
Golf associations